The Algerian Naval Force (ANF) is the naval branch of the Algerian military. The naval force operates from multiple bases along the country's nearly  coastline, fulfilling its primary role of monitoring and defending Algeria's territorial waters against all foreign military or economic intrusion. Additional missions include coast guard and maritime safety missions as well a projection of marine forces (fusiliers marins). Algerian forces are an important player in the Western Mediterranean.

As with other Algerian military branches, the naval force was built and structured with assistance from the Soviet Union during the Cold War, but has also relied on other sources for equipment in some areas. Since the end of the Cold War, Russia has remained an important partner, but Algeria has increasingly sought additional sources for equipment as well as building its own shipbuilding capacity.

Bases 
Principal naval bases are located at Algiers, Annaba, Mers el-Kebir, Oran, Jijel and Tamentfoust. Mers el Kébir is home to the OMCN/CNE shipbuilding facilities where several Algerian vessels have been built. Algeria's naval academy at Tamentfoust provides officer training equivalent to that of the army and the air force academies. The naval force also operates a technical training school for its personnel at Tamentfoust.

Equipment 

The bulk of the Algerian Naval Force is still based on Cold War designs, although work is being done to both acquire new platforms as well as modernize existing equipment. The surface fleet is equipped with a mixture of smaller ships well suited to coastal and Exclusive Economic Zone (EEZ) patrol work. The fleet is led by three Koni class frigates which have been updated with more modern systems. These are due to be augmented in the coming years by a pair of MEKO A-200 frigates which will represent the most modern equipment of the naval force when they enter service, also, Algeria signed a contract with China Shipbuilding Trading Company for the construction of three light frigates about 2,800 tons full load. A mixture of six corvettes and off-shore patrol vessels complement the frigates, while a large number of smaller boats cover the role of coastal patrol. Algeria had maintained a relatively large fleet of Osa class fast attack craft by the end of the Cold War, but it is questionable whether any of these remain in operational use.

Algeria has had a small submarine presence in the Mediterranean with a pair of Kilo class patrol submarines, though the recent acquisition of an additional four upgraded boats will expand this presence significantly. Their amphibious warfare capacity has traditionally been limited with a small group of landing ships essentially for coastal transport roles. This capacity will be greatly upgraded with the planned acquisition of an amphibious transport dock capable of supporting more robust operations. In the area of civil support, the purchase of seagoing rescue tugs will mark the first ability of an African nation to provide valuable services to economic and commercial operators in the Western Mediterranean.

The Algerian military has long maintained a strong veil of secrecy over its organization and equipment, making an exact accounting of operational vessels difficult to ascertain. Open sources are known to vary widely in their reports of several aspects of Algerian equipment.

Submarines

Amphibious warfare vessels

Surface combatants

Fleet auxiliaries

Aircraft

Modernization 

The Naval force is currently being upgraded with the following technological developments: the existing units are being modernized, with the submarine force strengthened by two new Kilo class submarines (last generation).

 One LPD from Italy in 2014.
 Two MEKO A200 frigates from Germany.
 TYPE 054A frigates
AIP Submarines
 Three corvettes C28A with option of three more produced locally. Radar and electronic equipment will be supplied by Thales, and mounted in Algeria. They will be built at Hudong Zhonghua Shipyard.
 31 units of the type FPB98 MKI Ocean Patrol Boat.
 12 units of Alusafe 2000 high speed rescue and patrol vessel.

Munitions

SAM 
Umkhonto (missile)
Aster (missile family)
HQ-7A (FM-90) - on board C28A Class Corvette .
HQ-10 - on board Type 056 corvette
9M33/SA-8 - Osa-M (SA-N-4)  naval version for Koni (Mourad Rais) frigate

Anti-ship Missiles 
RBS-15 Mk. III III will equip the two MEKO 200 frigates under construction for the Algerian National Navy. Delivery is scheduled for 2015–2016.
Kh-35 (SS-N-25)
C-802
SSC-3 Styx
3M-54E Club-S - anti-shipping variant, Its basic length is 8.2 m, with a 200 kg warhead
3M-14E Club-S - inertially guided land attack variant; it is launched from a submarine. Its basic length is 6.2 m, with a 450 kg warhead
P-900 Alfa
SS-N-2C
Kh-31M – 125 delivered in 2007-2009
Kh-59MK – 125 delivered in 2008-2009
CX-1
CM-302 – export version of the YJ-12
Bal-E – Coastal (SSC-6 Sennight) missile complex with Kh-35E

Air to ground Missiles 
Mokopa - the Algerian Navy's six new Super Lynx 300-series helicopters are conducting flight tests armed with Mokopa anti-armour missiles.
Raptor-2 Precision-Guided Glide Bomb series from South Africa

See also 
 List of Algerian ships

References 
Notes

Citations

Bibliography

External links 
 Algerian Navy ships and equipment

 
Military of Algeria